Stephen DeJuan "Bubba" Miller (born January 24, 1973) is a former American football offensive lineman in the National Football League (NFL) for the Philadelphia Eagles.  He played college football at the University of Tennessee.  He attended Brentwood Academy near Nashville, Tennessee, during his high school years, where he helped the Brentwood Eagles win multiple state championships.

Professional career
Miller signed with the Philadelphia Eagles as an undrafted free agent on April 27, 1996.

Post-playing career
Miller became the host of a radio show called "The Bubba Miller Show" on August 4, 2003.

Miller was a commentator during the All American Football League's inaugural draft on January 28, 2008.

References

1973 births
Living people
People from Nashville, Tennessee
American football centers
Tennessee Volunteers football players
Philadelphia Eagles players
New Orleans Saints players